Route Adélie de Vitré is a single-day road bicycle race held annually in April in a circuit around Vitré, France. Between 1980 and 1995 it was called Tour d'Armorique. Since 2005, the race is organized as a 1.1 event on the UCI Europe Tour. This race is named after the main partner Adélie, an ice cream brand distributed in all the Intermarché stores of France

Winners

External links
 

UCI Europe Tour races
Recurring sporting events established in 1986
1986 establishments in France
Cycle races in France